The 383rd Military Intelligence Battalion is an intelligence formation of the United States Army's Military Intelligence Corps, currently part of the Army Reserve and falling under 505th Military Intelligence Brigade (Theater) since 2015.

History 
The 383rd Military Intelligence Battalion can trace its lineage to a battalion of the same name constitution on 8 February 1951 in the Organized Reserve Corps.  The battalion was activated on 1 March 1951 in Newark, New Jersey.  On 9 July 1952, the Organized Reserve Corps was redesignated as the Army Reserve and the battalion consequently transferred.  On 28 February 1953, the battalion was inactivated.

On 28 March 1996, the battalion's headquarters became the Headquarters and Service Company, and the battalion consequently reconstituted.  The battalion joined the 464th Chemical Brigade, and would remain part of the brigade until 1 October 2007 when it was relieved.

On 16 September 2015, the 505th Military Intelligence Brigade (Theater) was re-activated as part of United States Army North.  The battalion's headquarters were established in Belton, Missouri.  The 383rd was subsequently re-activated and came under control of the brigade later that year.

Organization 
The organization of the battalion is as follows:

 Headquarters & Headquarters Company
 A Company, at Fort Leavenworth, Kansas (Regional Operations)
 B Company, at the New Century AirCenter, Kansas (Theater Support)
 C Company, in Kansas City, Missouri (Theater Engagement)

Footnotes

References 

 

Military units and formations established in 1951
Military units and formations established in 1996
Military units and formations established in 2015
Military units and formations disestablished in 1953
Military intelligence units and formations of the United States Army
Military intelligence units and formations of the United States
Military Intelligence battalions of the United States Army